Elk Hill may refer to:

Elk Hill (Forest, Virginia), listed on the National Register of Historic Places in Bedford County, Virginia
Elk Hill (Goochland, Virginia), listed on the National Register of Historic Places in Goochland County, Virginia
Elk Hill (Nellysford, Virginia), listed on the National Register of Historic Places in Nelson County, Virginia
Elk Hill (Pennsylvania), a mountain in Herrick Township, Susquehanna County